A hug is a form of physical intimacy.

Hug, Hugs or HUG may also refer to:

People
Hug (surname) (various people)
Hug I of Empúries (965–1040), Count of Empúries

Arts and entertainment
Hug (album), a Japanese album by Yui Aragaki
"Hug" (song), a Korean song by TVXQ DBSK
Hugs (song), a song written and recorded by American comedy hip hop group The Lonely Island with Pharrell Williams
"Hug" (Smallville), an episode of the television series Smallville

Other uses
Hug (folklore), in Scandinavian mythology, referring to mental life
Hug High School, in Reno, Nevada, United States
Geneva University Hospitals, Switzerland
Hugs (interpreter), a Haskell interpreter

See also
Hog (disambiguation)
Hugh (disambiguation)
Hugo (disambiguation)
Group hug (disambiguation)